Edmund Fisher may refer to:

Edmund Fisher (architect) (1872–1918), British architect
Edmund Fisher (publisher) (1939–1995), British publisher

See also
Edmond H. Fischer (1920–2021), American-Swiss biochemist
Edward Fisher (disambiguation)
Edwin Fisher (disambiguation)